KEYJ-FM (107.9 MHz) is a commercial radio station located in Abilene, Texas.  KEYJ-FM currently airs a mainstream rock format branded as "Rock 108" successfully blending "the best of the old and the new." The "Rock 108" branding came about in early 1989 (circa) as "The Home of Rock n Roll". This brought about a classic/current AOR format from its previous "Pop40" branded "Key-J 108". The station owners in the 80'-90's were Lloyd Mynat (who played Pro Football at one time) and Dave Boyal. The station is currently  owned and operated by Townsquare Media.

Before 1979, the call letters KEYJ were assigned to a station located in Jamestown, North Dakota broadcasting at 1400 AM (now KQDJ), which gained brief fame in 1957, when it was featured in Life Magazine, as the home of the "World's Youngest D-J", Shadoe Stevens.

KEYJ won the RadioContraband Rock Radio Award for the "Under the Radar" station of the Year in 2014.

External links
KEYJ official website

EYJ-FM
Mainstream rock radio stations in the United States
Radio stations established in 1957
Townsquare Media radio stations